Somraj Maity is an Indian actor who works in Bengali film and television industry. He is known for his portrayal as Abir in the TV serial Ei Chheleta Bhelbheleta, a romantic drama show which aired on Zee Bangla. He has also appeared in Piya Re, a romance drama film directed by Abhimanyu Mukherjee.

Career
Maity was an engineer. He is known for his portrayal as Abir in the TV serial Ei Chheleta Bhelbheleta, a romantic drama show which aired on Zee Bangla. Apart from Ei Cheleta Bhelbheleta he has also acted in serials such as Tekka Raja Badshah, Kunjochhaya and Jiyon Kathi. He has also worked in films such as  Raagini and Cholo Lets Live. In 2018, he appeared in Piya Re, a romantic drama film directed by Abhimanyu Mukherjee.

Filmography

Films

Television

Web series

Awards

References

External links 
 

Living people
Indian male television actors
Male actors in Bengali cinema
Bengali male actors
Bengali male television actors
21st-century Indian male actors
Bengali actors
Indian actors
Indian television actors
Year of birth missing (living people)